Building block or building blocks may refer to:
 Toy blocks
 Building blocks (toy)
 Concrete masonry unit
 Building block (chemistry)
 Components that are part of a larger system
 Building block model, a form of public utility regulation that is common in Australia